Marie Josephine Parente (May 22, 1928 – September 20, 2019) was an American politician who served in the Massachusetts House of Representatives from 1981 to 2007. 
A member of the Democratic Party, she ran for reelection in 2006 but lost renomination to primary challenger John V. Fernandes.

References

External links

 

Democratic Party members of the Massachusetts House of Representatives
1928 births
2019 deaths
University of Massachusetts Boston alumni
Women state legislators in Massachusetts
20th-century American politicians
21st-century American politicians
21st-century American women politicians
20th-century American women politicians